Pat Derby (June 7, 1942 – February 15, 2013) was a British-born American animal trainer for American television series during the 1960s and 1970s and later became a crusader for animal rights.

Early years
Born Patricia Bysshe Shelley in Sussex, England, her father Charles was a professor of English literature at Cambridge University who claimed to be a descendant of Percy Bysshe Shelley. As a child she often begged her father to take her to the circus to see the elephants. At age 15 she moved to New York City to study ballet and theater. She also enrolled at Columbia University, but dropped out at age 19 to move to California. While performing at a San Francisco nightclub she met animal trainer Ted Derby, and they married in 1964. The couple divorced in 1973.

Career
The couple trained wild animals for television shows and movies, using "affection methods" that avoided causing pain for the animal. But Pat disagreed with Ted's use of an electric cattle prod in training, and they divorced in the mid-1970s. She trained animals for the CBS television series Lassie, Gentle Ben and Daktari and the NBC series Flipper. She also worked on the Lincoln-Mercury ad campaign that featured Farrah Fawcett with two cougars in the 1970s.

In 1976 Derby was working with Christopher, her cougar who appeared in Lincoln-Mercury commercials, at the Cleveland auto show when she met Ed Stewart. She and Stewart founded the Performing Animal Welfare Society (PAWS) in 1984. Derby's 1976 book The Lady and Her Tiger was a harsh expose of the entertainment industry's treatment of animals, and PAWS became a leading advocate for better treatment of animals in captivity. PAWS first animal sanctuary encompassed 30 acres outside Galt, California, and was the first in the United States capable of caring for elephants.

Death
Derby died at her home in San Andreas, California following a long battle with throat cancer.

External links

 Performing Animal Welfare Society

References

1942 births
2013 deaths
Animal trainers
Deaths from cancer in California
Deaths from throat cancer
People from Sussex
British expatriates in the United States
People from San Andreas, California